Kevyn James Aucoin (February 14, 1962 – May 7, 2002) was an American make-up artist, photographer and author. In the 1990s, Aucoin was wholly responsible for the "sculpted" look of many celebrities and top models, including Whitney Houston, Cher, Madonna, Cindy Crawford, Liza Minnelli, Courtney Love, Tina Turner, Janet Jackson, Naomi Campbell, Tori Amos, and Vanessa Williams. He authored several industry-defining books with makeup techniques including facial contouring, which was relatively unknown in popular culture at the time, but pioneered and used in drag culture and stage makeup for decades prior. Aucoin, often noted as being decades ahead of his contemporaries, is considered to be one of greatest make-up artists of the modern age.

Early life
Aucoin was born in Shreveport, Louisiana and grew up in Lafayette, Louisiana. Born to a teenage single mother, he was adopted as an infant by Isidore Adrian Aucoin and Thelma (née Melancon) Aucoin. His three siblings, Carla, Kim, and Keith, were adopted as well.

Aucoin was interested in makeup from the time he was a child, and frequently did his sisters' makeup and photographed the results with a Polaroid camera—something he'd do throughout his career. Afraid to buy makeup, he would shoplift it. The guilt of stealing and fear of getting caught made him stop.

He realized he was gay at age six. His parents were unaware of their son's sexual orientation; his mother later said, "I didn't think Kevyn was a sissy; I just thought he was a gentle child." Years later, his parents became staunch advocates for LBGTQ rights, and started a chapter of P-FLAG in Lafayette.

Aucoin was relentlessly bullied in school. In one instance, a teacher spanked his bare buttocks in class, which Aucoin later regarded as sexual abuse.  The bullying escalated in high school. When he was chased by some classmates in a truck, he dropped out. He then enrolled in cosmetology school to take a makeup class. Instead, his self-taught skills resulted in his becoming the instructor at age 18.

Aucoin then worked in a small corner of an exclusive women's store in Lafayette. But women were uncomfortable with a man doing their makeup. His mother Thelma recalled, "It was $30 for a makeup lesson, and these were women who paid $3,000 for a dress, but they'd never let him."

In 1982, Aucoin moved to Baton Rouge, Louisiana, thinking a larger city could help build his career as a makeup artist. He soon experienced the homophobia he'd endured in Lafayette. Kevyn and two male friends went to Godchaux's, a local department store, to browse the newest makeup. A security guard approached them and said "upstairs or downtown"—meaning they could be taken to the store's security office or be arrested. All three men opted for the security office, where they were beaten by security personnel. Fearing for his life if he stayed in Louisiana, he moved to New York City with his then-boyfriend Jed Root, who sometimes posed as his manager.

Career
The first year he was in New York, Aucoin did makeup on test models for free to build up his portfolio. He and Root were broke, living in an apartment that often had no heat. Word of his makeup skills began circulating, and he was contacted by Vogue. For the next year and a half, he worked daily with Vogue photographer Steven Meisel. In the three years following his first Vogue shoot, he did a total of 18 more.  In 1984, he collaborated on Revlon's Nakeds line, the first line based solely on skin tones. However, his Vogue cover shoot with emerging supermodel Cindy Crawford in 1986 skyrocketed his career. During 1987–89, he did nine Vogue covers in a row, and an additional seven Cosmopolitan covers. At his peak, he would be booked months in advance and could command as much as $6,000 for a makeup session. He became one of the best-paid celebrity makeup artists in history. Unlike most makeup artists at the time, he would refuse to do makeup on models he felt were too young.

Aucoin's philosophy was that every woman is beautiful within, and makeup was simply his tool for helping her discover that beauty.  He wrote a regular column about this philosophy for Allure.  A comment he made in a 2000 column, calling members of the National Rifle Association "morons", drew a record amount of mail and a few death threats.

Ultima II

In 1983, Revlon hired Aucoin, at the age of 21, as Creative Director for their prestige Ultima II line of cosmetics. A year later, Aucoin would launch The New Nakeds (later renamed The Nakeds), a groundbreaking line that was a strong counterpoint to cosmetics available at the time. Says Linda Wells, editor of Allure magazine, of the line: "It may not seem like it, but it was a powerful moment. Before, there were makeup lines for white women and others for black women. But he worked to design makeup for all skin tones. The idea was to empower a woman by revealing her natural beauty, and not to cover her up with layers of product."

The New Nakeds embraced a radically different aesthetic than the norm of the time: foundations that featured a yellow undertone, instead of pink or peach; eyeshadows, lipstick and blushes were brown-based, neutral tones that were free of the pastel, vivid, or sparkly colors. Although Ultima II (and all of Revlon's beauty divisions) were in a decline at the time, the New Nakeds resuscitated interest in the brand and helped re-establish Ultima II as a viable competitor in the prestige arena.

The colors, textures and finishes Aucoin created in the New Nakeds would serve as the most influential direction of the latter part of the century, and visible as brands MAC, Bobbi Brown, and Laura Mercier all launched with their version of the products Aucoin created years earlier.

Inoui cosmetics
Later, Aucoin would work with Japanese cosmetics giant Shiseido on their Inoui line. He would later be approached by both Vincent Longo and Laura Mercier to endorse their eponymous lines, but decided to launch his own brand, Kevyn Aucoin Beauty, in 2001 instead.

Celebrity work, writing, and appearances
Aucoin worked with hundreds of celebrities, including Madonna, Whitney Houston, Cher, Liza Minnelli, Janet Jackson Tina Turner, Gwyneth Paltrow, Lisa Marie Presley, Courtney Love, and Vanessa L. Williams.

He began publishing his creations in books: The Art of Makeup, Making Faces, and Face Forward, two of which became Time magazine best sellers; Making Faces debuted at number one. The books featured celebrities, along with everyday people (including his mother), in makeup and costumes to resemble other celebrities. He transformed Celine Dion into Maria Callas; Lisa Marie Presley into Marilyn Monroe; Courtney Love into Jean Harlow; Christina Ricci into Édith Piaf; Hilary Swank into Raquel Welch; Winona Ryder into Elizabeth Taylor; Tionne "T-Boz" Watkins into Josephine Baker; and Martha Stewart into Veronica Lake, among others. Face Forward was widely noted for introducing makeup sculpting and contouring to the general public for the first time.

Aucoin made appearances on Good Morning America and The Oprah Winfrey Show. He played as himself in an episode of Sex and the City called "The Real Me" (Season 4, Episode 2), doing Carrie Bradshaw's makeup for a fashion show during New York Fashion Week.  In addition, he appeared with Cher in "Gypsies, Tramps, and Weed" (Season 3, Episode 7) of Will & Grace.

Aucoin was an interview subject (along with dancer Bill T. Jones and explorer Ann Bancroft) in Oliver Button is a Star!, a video reinterpretation of Tomie dePaola's children's book "Oliver Button Is a Sissy."

In 1999 he received an honorary diploma from Harvey Milk High School for his support of gay and transgender youth.

Personal life 
Aucoin eventually found his birth parents, and was able to personally meet them and his half-siblings.

He was in a long-term relationship with Eric Sakas, who remained a close friend after their breakup. Sakas later became president and creative director of Kevyn Aucoin Beauty.

Aucoin began dating Jeremy Antunes in 1999. They married in Hawaii in 2000, in an unofficial ceremony since same-sex marriage was not legally recognized at the time. Aucoin's 15-year-old niece, Samantha, lived with them after Aucoin obtained legal guardianship.

Death

In September 2001, after increasing amounts of back pain and headaches, Aucoin was diagnosed with a rare pituitary tumor. He had been suffering from acromegaly resulting from the tumor for much of his life, but it had gone undiagnosed. He underwent a successful surgery and had the tumor removed, but continued to experience pain.

Aucoin began taking increasing amounts of prescription and non-prescription painkillers to ease his physical and mental suffering. Antunes implored Aucoin to get help, and Aucoin made many attempts to recover, but could not stop the drug use entirely. Antunes went to Paris for a week to be alone. That same week, Aucoin's health rapidly declined and he was hospitalized. Antunes' leaving Aucoin for what became the last week of his life created animosity between Aucoin's family and Antunes, resulting in Antunes being locked out of the home he shared with Aucoin.

Aucoin died on May 7, 2002 at Westchester Medical Center in Valhalla, New York of kidney and liver failure due to acetaminophen toxicity, caused by prescription painkillers. His mother Thelma died soon afterwards in October 2002, ostensibly from grief. Despite his instructions that his ashes be scattered in Hawaii, at the site where he and Antunes married, Aucoin's ashes are interred with his mother in Louisiana.

The Kevyn Aucoin Beauty brand has remained in business since his death, and is still sold in multiple stores, including Bergdorf Goodman, Neiman Marcus, Nordstrom, Sephora, and Space.NK.

Posthumous media 
Kevyn Aucoin: A Beautiful Life—The Success, Struggles, and Beauty Secrets of a Legendary Makeup Artist was published in 2003 by Atria Books and Simon and Schuster.  The book was edited by Kerry Diamond and reviewed Aucoin's career through celebrity interviews, his beauty tips and techniques, and over 250 photographs.

Kevyn Aucoin: Beauty & The Beast In Me, a documentary directed by Lori Kaye, features Aucoin's own personal videos taken throughout his life. It premiered as the documentary centerpiece at Outfest in July 2017 and had its TV debut on Logo TV on September 14, 2017. The film was also featured in the 125th anniversary (September 2017) issue of Vogue Magazine.

Larger Than Life: The Kevyn Aucoin Story is feature-length documentary directed by Tiffany Bartok. The film focuses on the rise his career and the legacy he left behind. The film also highlights Aucoin's LGBTQ activism, from his struggle to live openly as a young gay man in his hometown, to marrying his partner and creating a family of his own. It also addresses the issues behind Aucoin's untimely death. It premiered at the 25th Hamptons International Film Festival in October 2017, and its New York City premiere was featured in Doc NYC in November 2017. Aucoin's former partner, Eric Sakas, is an associate producer of the film.

In popular culture
The Tori Amos song "Taxi Ride" from her 2002 album Scarlet's Walk is a partial homage to Aucoin. He made a cameo appearance in a fourth season episode (Episode 2: "The Real Me") of the long-running HBO series Sex and the City. He was a major fan of the Comedy Central show Strangers With Candy and appeared in an episode alongside Amy Sedaris and Stephen Colbert as a funeral makeup artist (Season 2, Episode 4: The Goodbye Guy).  In the show Fat Actress debut episode "Big Butts", Kirstie Alley's female hair and makeup artist goes by the name Kevyn after her inspiration Kevyn Aucoin.

Books authored
 The Art of Makeup, Harper-Collins Publishers. 1994. 176p. illus.
 The Art of Makeup, Perennial Currents. 1996. 176p. illus.
 Making Faces, Little, Brown. 1999. 160p. illus.
 Face Forward, Little, Brown. 2000. 175p. illus.

References

External links

 
Larger Than Life: The Kevyn Aucoin Story 
 
 
 Kevyn Aucoin: Beauty & The Beast In Me

1962 births
2002 deaths
20th-century American businesspeople
21st-century American businesspeople
American adoptees
American cosmetics businesspeople
American make-up artists
20th-century American photographers
Photographers from Louisiana
Businesspeople from Louisiana
Deaths from multiple organ failure
Drug-related deaths in New York (state)
American gay artists
American gay writers
American LGBT photographers
American LGBT businesspeople
LGBT people from Louisiana
LGBT people from Texas
LGBT people from New York (state)
Gay photographers
Gay businessmen
Writers from Lafayette, Louisiana
Writers from Shreveport, Louisiana
People with acromegaly
People from Valhalla, New York
20th-century American LGBT people